Ken's Artisan Bakery is a bakery in Portland, Oregon's Northwest District, in the United States.

History
Ken Forkish established the bakery in 2001.

Reception

In 2022, Eater Portland's Brooke Jackson-Glidden called Ken's Artisan Bakery "an iconic Portland destination for bread and pastries".

References

External links

 
 
 Ken's Artisan Bakery at Zomato

2001 establishments in Oregon
Bakeries of Oregon
Northwest District, Portland, Oregon
Restaurants established in 2001
Restaurants in Portland, Oregon